Geminia is a monotypic genus of Burmese huntsman spiders containing the single species, Geminia sulphurea. It was first described by Tamerlan Thorell in 1897, and is found in Myanmar.

See also
 List of Sparassidae species

References

Monotypic Araneomorphae genera
Sparassidae
Spiders of Asia
Taxa named by Tamerlan Thorell